Staff Sergeant Marcario García also known as Macario García   (January 20, 1920 – December 24, 1972) was the first Mexican immigrant to receive the Medal of Honor, the United States' highest military decoration. He received the award for his heroic actions as a soldier during World War II.

Early years
García was born in Villa de Castaños, Mexico in the state of Coahuila, one of ten children born to destitute farm workers. In 1923, Garcia's family immigrated to the United States in search of a better way of life. They eventually settled in Sugar Land, Texas where he worked alongside his parents as a cotton farmer.

Upon the outbreak of World War II, Garcia joined the United States Army at a recruiting station in his adopted hometown in November 1942. He was assigned to Company B, 22nd Infantry Regiment, 4th Infantry Division.

World War II Service
Garcia participated in, and was wounded during, the Allied invasion of Normandy in June 1944. Awarded the Purple Heart, he soon returned to duty where he later earned the Bronze Star. On November 27, 1944, García was an acting squad leader in his platoon, which found itself engaged in combat against the German troops in the vicinity of Grosshau, Germany. Realizing that his company could not advance because it was pinned down by enemy machine gun fire, Garcia, on his own initiative, went ahead alone, destroying two enemy emplacements and capturing four prisoners. Despite being wounded himself, he continued to fight on with his unit until the objective was taken. "Only then did he permit himself to be removed for medical care," his Medal of Honor citation states. In an interview with the Houston Chronicle several years later, Garcia said: "I did not know the wound was so serious. I was numb, I think, and besides, we were moving forward, and it was not the time to stop." Captain Tony Bizzarro, B  company commander, made the initial recommendation for the Medal of Honor. He thought Garcia was nothing less than the best soldier in the Army. "He was always willing to do anything he was asked to do," Bizzarro later told the Chronicle.

Medal of Honor citation

Honors and discrimination

On August 23, 1945, the President of the United States, Harry S. Truman presented Staff Sergeant García with the Medal of Honor at a ceremony in the White House. Shortly afterward, his native land of Mexico awarded him the Mérito Militar, one of the highest awards in the Mexican Army, for valor. A month after he was awarded the Medal of Honor, Garcia was denied service at a restaurant located in a town just a few miles south of Houston because he was Hispanic. Garcia was beaten with a bat by the owner. No one was arrested and no charges were initially filed. It was only after national columnist Walter Winchell reported the incident and labeled Sugar Land the most racist city in America that charges were filed—against Garcia. Then the incident was covered by the news media, and caused an uproar amongst the Mexican community who rallied to his aid. The nation was made aware as to the discriminatory policies that Mexican-Americans were subject to, as the case against Garcia was repeatedly postponed before being dropped.

Later years

García became an American citizen on June 25, 1947, and earned a high school diploma in 1951. On May 18, 1952, he married Alicia Reyes with whom he had three children. For twenty-five years he worked as a counselor in the Veterans' Administration.

On the evening of November 21, 1963, Marcario García greeted President John F. Kennedy at the door of the Rice Ballroom in Houston Texas. The ballroom was filled with a diverse crowd of attendees that included Hispanic World War II veterans, Civil Rights advocates and future political activists. The president spoke of U.S. and Latin American Foreign Policy and the importance of recognition and acknowledgement of Hispanic organizations like the League of United Latin American Citizens (LULAC). Speaking in fluent Spanish, Mrs. Kennedy offered words of inspiration and encouragement. The day after this meeting Kennedy was assassinated.

García died on December 24, 1972, from injuries which he received in a car accident. He was buried with full military honors in the Houston National Cemetery in Houston, Texas. The local government of Houston honored his memory by naming a middle school after him as well as renaming part of 69th Street in Houston "S/SGT Marcario García Street". In 1983 Vice President George Bush dedicated Houston's new Macario García Army Reserve Center, and in 1994 Macario Garcia Middle School of the Fort Bend Independent School District, in unincorporated Fort Bend County, Texas, near Sugar Land, was named in García's honor.

On November 11 2021, a mural by artist Mez Data, was unveiled and dedicated along an exterior wall of Houston Fire Station #20, which is along S/Sgt. Macario Garcia Drive at Navigation Boulevard.Melissa Correa KHOU 11.

Awards and recognitions
Staff Sergeant Marcario García's decorations and medals were the following:

Foreign award
Mérito Militar - Mexico

Notes

See also

List of Medal of Honor recipients
List of Medal of Honor recipients for World War II
Hispanic Medal of Honor recipients
Hispanic Americans in World War II

References

Further reading
The following books make references to Marcario García's exploits.

Medal of Honor: Historical Facts And Figures, page 167, by Ron Owens
The Battle of Hurtgen Forest (West Wall Series) (West Wall), page 133, by Charles Whiting
The Quest for Tejano Identity in San Antonio, Texas, 1913-2000 (Latino Communities: Emerging Voices—Political, Social, Cultural and Legal Issues), page 56, by Jr., Richard Buitron and Richard Buitron
ÁRaza Sí! ÁGuerra No!: Chicano Protest and Patriotism during the Viet Nam War Era, page 36, by Lorena Oropeza
Moon Handbooks Charleston and Savannah (Moon Handbooks), page 115, by Mike Sigalas

External links

1920 births
1972 deaths
United States Army personnel of World War II
United States Army Medal of Honor recipients
Mexican emigrants to the United States
Military personnel from Houston
United States Army soldiers
Foreign-born Medal of Honor recipients
Burials at Houston National Cemetery
World War II recipients of the Medal of Honor
Mexican-born Medal of Honor recipients
Road incident deaths in Texas